Rowrah railway station was built by the Whitehaven, Cleator and Egremont Railway. It served the village of Rowrah, Cumbria, England.

Local lines
Rowrah was connected by three separate railway companies:
 The Whitehaven, Cleator and Egremont Railway curving southwest to north through the station.
 "Baird's Line" - a branch of the Cleator and Workington Junction Railway arriving at Rowrah from the northwest, and
 The Rowrah and Kelton Fell Railway which conveyed minerals from mines in the hills to the southeast.

Neither of the latter two ran directly through the station, but all were connected and complex interworking took place.

Services
The Rowrah and Kelton Fell Railway was a mineral railway pure and simple. It never carried passengers or general goods.

Baird's Line was also a mineral line, though workmen's trains ran from Rowrah's "other" station at Arlecdon, which was on the north western edge of the village.

Rowrah Station's owning Whitehaven, Cleator and Egremont company was taken over by the LNWR and Furness Railway in 1879 as a Joint Line, whereafter the northern section through the station was usually worked by the LNWR. Passenger traffic northwards consisted of three trains a day in each direction, with an extra on Whitehaven market day and none on Sundays. Those few trains were supplemented southwards to Moor Row and Whitehaven, with a further four starting at Rowrah.

From opening, northbound passenger trains terminated at Marron Junction station where passengers changed for destinations beyond. In 1897 Marron Junction station closed, with trains running west through to Workington Main thereafter, a much better arrangement for most passengers. Passengers who would otherwise have changed at Marron Junction to head east to Brigham or beyond simply changed at the first stop after Marron Junction - Camerton.

No Sunday passenger service ever ran over the line.

Goods traffic usually consisted of two daily turns Up and Down.

Mineral traffic was the dominant flow, typically six loaded and six empty through to Workington, though this was subject to considerable fluctuation with trade cycles. Stations and signalling along the line north of Rowrah were changed during the Joint regime to conform to LNWR standards.

Rundown and closure
The Rowrah and Kelton Fell Railway closed in stages between 1920 and 1926. Its tracks were lifted in 1934. The Gilgarron Branch which ran westwards from Ullock Junction closed east of Distington with the ironworks there in the late 1920s. Baird's Line closed on 8 August 1938, with its limestone traffic to Workington being switched to the Rowrah to Marron Junction line. By 1954 this had been re-routed again, this time to run via Moor Row, rendering the line to Marron Junction redundant. This limestone traffic continued until 1978, long outlasting all other services to, from or through Rowrah.

The station closed on 13 April 1931 when normal passenger traffic ended along the line, though workmen's trains were reinstated in March 1940, only to be withdrawn a month later. Goods trains continued to call until 1954, but mineral traffic was down to the one limestone flow. An enthusiasts' special called on 5 September 1954. After scant occasional use the line northwards from Rowrah was abandoned in 1960 and subsequently lifted.

Such was the goods, ad hoc passenger traffic and special services that Rowrah continued to have a staffed station until 1967, 36 years after passenger services officially ceased.

Identified railway staff from Rowrah include:-

 George Stoddart was the last station master at Rowrah serving from 1947 to May 1967, leaving into retirement.
 Samuel Hastings, railway clerk, married Miss Mary Ann Yates both of Rowrah - 18th MARCH 1882

Afterlife
In 2009 Rowrah Station was a private residence.

See also

 Cockermouth and Workington Railway
 Cockermouth, Keswick and Penrith Railway
 Furness Railway

References

Sources

Further reading

External links
Map of the line with photos in RAILSCOT
The station on overlain OS maps surveyed from 1898 in National Library of Scotland
The closed station on a 1948 OS Map in npe maps
The station in Rail Map Online
The railways of Cumbria in Cumbrian Railways Association
Photos of Cumbrian railways in Cumbrian Railways Association
The railways of Cumbria in Railways of Cumbria
Cumbrian Industrial History in Cumbria Industrial History Society
The line's and station's Engineer's Line References in Railway Codes
Furness Railtour using many West Cumberland lines 5 September 1954 in Six Bells Junction
A video tour-de-force of the region's closed lines in Cumbria Film Archive
1882 RCH Diagram showing the station, see page 173 of the pdf in google
The remains of Rowrah No.1 signalbox in Signalbox

Disused railway stations in Cumbria
1967 disestablishments in England
Railway stations in Great Britain opened in 1864
Railway stations in Great Britain closed in 1931
1864 establishments in England